A book truck, book trolley,  or book cart is a small wheeled vehicle, typically with two or three shelves, used in libraries to move books.

Book trucks are used to move large quantities of books. They work well when the move is in the same library. When the move is longer, the book truck may not be as useful as there may be a need to travel to different levels of a building.

The Library Book Cart Drill Team Championship takes place every year during the annual conference of the American Library Association.

References

Furniture
Carts